Krrish is an Indian actor who predominantly appears in Tamil and Malayalam cinema. He made his debut in the commercially successful Yennai Arindhaal directed by Gautham Vasudev Menon starring Ajith Kumar in 2015. Then went on to play one of the antagonists in the Tamil hit Achcham Yenbadhu Madamaiyada also directed by Gautham Vasudev Menon in 2016. He made his Malayalam debut with Kinavalli directed by Sugeeth in 2018 for which he won the Asiavision Awards for most promising actor. Kinavalli garnered positive reviews from critics and the audiences alike. His latest release is the comic caper web series  "What's up Velakkari" which has released in Zee 5 in December 2018. He plays a funny Cop called Rakesh. The web series has been released in 7 languages in India. His latest Tamil film is ‘Hostel’ directed by Sumanth Radhakrishnan starring Ashok Selvan, Priya Bhavani Shankar and comedian Sathish.

Career
He starts his career as an assistant director to Gautham Vasudev Menon. He made his acting debut in the movie Yennai Arindhaal, directed by Gautham Menon and later played the antagonist in the bilingual Achcham Enbadhu Madamaiyada. He was be seen next in Santhosh Nair's upcoming bilingual film Rangeela as the leading hero along with Sunny Leone. His on going movies are Suresh Unnithan's Kshanam and Srinath Rajendran's magnum opus Kurup starring Dulquer Salmaan and Indrajith Sukumaran.

Awards

Filmography

References

External links
 
 

Male actors in Tamil cinema
Living people
1989 births